Florentyna Parker (born 20 June 1989) is an English professional golfer born in Germany.

Amateur career
In 2006, Parker was in the training squad for the 2006 Curtis Cup. She competed in the 2008 Curtis Cup where she won her singles match.

Professional career
In 2010, Parker won the ABN AMRO Ladies Open on the Ladies European Tour by two strokes.  This win qualified her for the 2010 Women's British Open played at her home course Royal Birkdale Golf Club.  This was her first tour win.  

In 2014, Parker won the Ladies Italian Open by one stroke. Similar to her 2010 victory, this qualified her for the Women's British Open at her home club.

In 2017, she won the Estrella Damm Mediterranean Ladies Open by overcoming a four-shot deficit. This victory came in a playoff.

Professional wins (3)

Ladies European Tour (3)

Team appearances
Amateur
 European Lady Junior's Team Championship (representing England): 2006
Junior Ryder Cup (representing Europe): 2004 (winners)
Junior Solheim Cup (representing Europe): 2005, 2007 (winners)
European Ladies' Team Championship (representing England): 2007, 2008
Curtis Cup (representing Great Britain and Ireland): 2008

Professional
Solheim Cup (representing Europe): 2017
The Queens (representing Europe): 2017

Solheim Cup record

References

External links

English female golfers
Ladies European Tour golfers
Solheim Cup competitors for Europe
People from Henstedt-Ulzburg
Sportspeople from Hamburg
1989 births
Living people